Richard Kelly Tipping (born 1949) is an Australian poet and artist best known for his visual poetry, word art, and large-scale public artworks. Examples of his work are held in major collections in Australia and abroad.

Early life and education
Tipping was born into a medical family in Adelaide, South Australia, in 1949. He studied film, philosophy and literature at Flinders University, graduating in 1972.

In 2007 Tipping completed a doctorate at the University of Technology Sydney (UTS) titled Word Art Works: visual poetry and textual objects.

Career
After graduation in 1972, Tipping spent a year in Sydney, which included exhibiting with Aleks Danko at Watters Gallery. He then travelled in the United States and lived in San Francisco, meeting with poets including Michael McClure. He returned to Adelaide in 1975 where he began working with the South Australian Film Corporation until 1978.

He began composing typographic concrete poetry on a manual typewriter in 1967, exploring the arrangement of letters on the page as a field of poetic composition. Literary concern is integral to his practice in word art and visual poetry.

In 1975 Tipping co-founded the ongoing Friendly Street Poets, which began open-mic poetry readings in Adelaide, and edited their first anthology, Friendly Street Poetry Reader, in 1977.

Between 1984 and 1986 he lived in Europe and England with his family, while making documentaries about expatriate writers such as Randolph Stow in Sussex, Peter Porter in London, Jack Lindsay in Cambridge, and David Malouf in Tuscany.

He lectured in communication and media arts at the University of Newcastle, NSW between 1989 and 2010.

In 2021 he opened an art gallery WordXimage  in Maitland, NSW specialising in text-picture relationships.

Art
Tipping is known for his visual poetry and word art, including artsigns, textual sculpture, subvertising graphics, and large-scale public artworks both permanent and temporary.

In the 1970s Tipping began collecting ironies and oddities in public signage through photography, and changing public signs to make poetic messages. Signs of Australia  (1982) collected many of these found sign anomalies. Signature works from his explorations of public sign language include No Understanding in the collection of the National Gallery of Australia. His public art projects include the well known Watermark (2000) steel sculpture (popularly known as "Flood") on the Brisbane River, which became the high-water mark for a major flood in 2011.

He has had more than 30 solo exhibitions in Australia as well as in New York, London, Munich, Cologne and Berlin.

Collections
Examples of his work are held in the collections of many public galleries, including the Art Gallery of New South Wales and the British Museum.

Tipping is represented in many important art collections, including the print collections of the Museum of Modern Art, New York; the National Gallery of Australia, Canberra;  The Art Gallery of New South Wales; National Gallery of Victoria; Art Gallery of South Australia; Queensland Art Gallery, Tasmanian Museum and Art Gallery, the Museum and Art Gallery of the Northern Territory; the Powerhouse Museum, Sydney; the Museum of Contemporary Art, Sydney; the Brisbane Powerhouse; and many regional art galleries. Many of the major Australian libraries, as well as international art collections hold his work.

Recognition
Articles about his art can be found in Art Almanac, Look magazine of the Art Gallery of New South Wales, Art Guide, and Limelight

Publications

Poetry
As a poet he has published three books of poems with University of Queensland Press, which are available on Poetry Library, and more recent collections such as Tommy Ruff (2014)  and Instant History (2017) 

His poems are represented in many anthologies, such as the Penguin Book of Modern Australian Poetry and the New Oxford Book of Australian Verse.

As editor/compiler
The Word as Art special issue of Artlink (Vol 27 No.1, 2007),
The Friendly Street Poetry Reader, 1st issue (Adelaide University Press, 1977)
 Mok: A Magazine of Contemporary Dissolution and Intemperance (5 issues 1968–1969, co-editor) – the first of a wave of small magazines in late 1960s defining a shift in Australian poetry which became known as "The Generation of 68".

Film
In the 1980s Tipping made documentary films on writers including David Malouf, Randolph Stow, Peter Porter, Roland Robinson and Les Murray.

Works 
Books
 Instant History, poems, (Flying Island Books, Macau, 2017) 
  Tommy Ruff, poems, (PressPress, Berry, NSW, 2014) 
 Off the Page and Back Again, visual poems and sculptures, (Writers Forum, London, 2010)
 Subvert I Sing, visual poems and graphics, (Red Fox Press, Ireland, 2008) 
 Notes towards Employment, poetry, (Picaro Press, Warners Bay NSW, 2006)
 Five O'Clock Shadows, poetry, (Thorny Devil Press, Newcastle, 1989)
 Nearer by Far, poetry, (University of Queensland Press, 1986)
 Headlines to the Heart, poetry with drawings by Maize Turner, (Pothole Press, London, 1985)
 Diverse Voice, visual poetry, (The International Poetry Archive, Oxford, 1985)
 Signs of Australia, photographs, (Penguin Books Australia, 1982)
 Domestic Hardcore, poetry, (University of Queensland Press, 1975)
 Soft Riots, poetry, (University of Queensland Press, 1972)

Print Folios 
 Lovepoems, 20 screenprints in a folio, (Thorny Devil Press, Newcastle, 2007)
 The Sydney Morning 1-IV, 50 prints in four folios, (Thorny Devil Press, Newcastle, 1989–1994)
 Word Works, 10 large screenprints, (Adelaide, 1979)

Catalogues
 Art Word" (Latrobe Regional Art Gallery, Morwell, Victoria 
 Instant History (Australian Galleries, Sydney, 2017) 
 Only Emotion Endures (Australian Galleries, Sydney, 2008)
 Multiple Choice (Lake Macquarie City Art Gallery, NSW, 2007)
 Roadsigned, postcard pack, (National Gallery of Australia, Canberra, 2005)
 Public Works (Greenaway Art Gallery, Adelaide, 2002)
 City Rubbings (Conny Dietzschold Gallery, Sydney and Cologne, 2002)
 Hear the Art (The Eagle Gallery, London, 1997)
 Multiple Pleasures (Art Gallery of New South Wales, Sydney, 1996)
 Word Works 2 (Powell Street Gallery, Melbourne, 1980)
 Word Works (Robin Gibson Gallery, Sydney, 1980)

Solo exhibitions
 Art Word" (Latrobe Regional Art Gallery, Morwell, Victoria) 
 Instant History (Australian Galleries, Sydney, 2017) 
 Studio (Australian Galleries, Sydney, 2012)
 Hearth (Australian Galleries, Melbourne, 2009)
 Only Emotion Endures (Australian Galleries, Sydney, 2008)
 Subvert I Sing (Multiple Box Sydney, 2008)
 Multiple Choice (Lake Macquarie City Art Gallery, NSW, 2007)
 Fresh Concrete (John Miller Gallery, Newcastle, 2007)
 Imagine Silence (Greenaway Art Gallery, Adelaide, 2007)
 Errrorism, (Multiple Box Sydney, 2004)
 Art Signs and Word Sculptures (Banning + Low, Washington DC, 2004)
 Exit Strategy (The Studio, Sydney Opera House, 2004)
 Street Talk (Banning Gallery, New York, 2003)
 Public Works (Greenaway Art Gallery, Adelaide, 2002)
 One Two Many (Multiple Box Sydney, 2001)
 Versions: Perversions, Subversions and Verse (Ubu Gallery, New York, 1998) 
 Hear the Art (The Eagle Gallery, London, 1997)</ref>
 Multiple Pleasures (Art Gallery of New South Wales, Sydney, 1996)
 Art Allergy with Alex Selenitsch, (Rhumbarellas Gallery, Melbourne, 1994)
 Between the Lines (United Artists Gallery, Melbourne, 1984)
 Fast Art (Garry Anderson Gallery, Sydney, 1983)
 Ideagraphics (Rosyln Oxley Gallery, Sydney, 1983)
 Inside Outside (Ray Hughes Gallery, Brisbane, 1981)
 Word Works 2 (Powell Street Gallery, Melbourne, 1980)
 Word Works (Robin Gibson Gallery, Sydney, 1980)
 The Everlasting Stone (Adelaide Festival Centre Gallery, 1978)
 Soft Riots with Aleks Danko, (Watters Gallery, Sydney, 1973)
 Uck with Aleks Danko, (Llewellyn Gallery, Adelaide, 1970)

Group exhibitions
More than 50 appearances in group exhibitions since 1975 including:
 The Essential Duchamp, Art Gallery of New South Wales, 2019, including an artist talk (see links in this reference) 
 Sculpture by the Sea Bondi, 2016 (also 1998, 1999, 2003, 2005, 2006, 2011, 2013, 2014, 2015)
 The Silent Scream (Monash University, 2011)
 Avoiding Myth and Message: Australian Artists and the Literary World (Museum of Contemporary Art, Sydney, 2009)
 Mapping Correspondence: Mail Art in the 21st Century (Center for Books Arts, New York, 2008)
 Multiplicity: Print and Multiples (Museum of Contemporary Art, Sydney, 2006)
 The National Sculpture Prize and Exhibition (National Gallery of Australia, Canberra, 2003)

Film and video
 Documentary portraits of Australian writers including Roland Robinson, Les Murray, Peter Porter, Randolph Stowe, David Malouf, and Sumner Locke-Elliott (1984–86)
 Documentary portraits of artists who make books including: Bob Cobbing (UK), Ronald King (UK), Warren Lehrer (US), Ed Ruscha (US), Christo and Jeanne-Claude (US), Purgatory Pie Press (US) and other in progress (1994–present).

References

External links 
  Artpoem site
  Richard Tipping's home page

Australian poets
20th-century Australian sculptors
Living people
1949 births
21st-century Australian sculptors
Visual poets